Drescheratherium is an extinct genus of mammal from the Late Jurassic (Kimmeridgian) Camadas de Guimarota of Leiria, Portugal. It is represented by fairly complete upper jaws with teeth. It bears elongated upper canines, though not to the extent another dryolestoid, Cronopio, does.

See also

 Prehistoric mammal
 List of prehistoric mammals

References

Dryolestida
Late Jurassic mammals of Europe
Jurassic Portugal
Fossils of Portugal
Fossil taxa described in 1998
Prehistoric mammal genera